Chulpan (Sulpan) is a rural locality (a village) in Urtakulsky Selsoviet, Buzdyaksky District, Bashkortostan, Russia. The population was 76 as of 2010. There is 1 street.

Geography 
Chulpan is located 6 km west of Buzdyak (the district's administrative centre) by road. Buzdyak is the nearest rural locality.

References 

Rural localities in Buzdyaksky District